"Just What I Needed" is a song by American rock band the Cars from their self-titled debut album (1978). The song, which first achieved radio success as a demo, took inspiration from the Ohio Express and the Velvet Underground. The song is sung by bass player Benjamin Orr and was written by Ric Ocasek.

"Just What I Needed" was released as the band's first single in 1978, reaching number 27 on the US Billboard Hot 100 and charting in several other countries. Appearing on numerous compilation albums, it has become one of the band's most popular songs and has been received positively by critics.

Background
Like several other tracks on The Cars, "Just What I Needed" originated as a demo tape recorded by the band in 1977. Ocasek had originally written the song in the basement of the commune he lived in at the time. Cars keyboardist Greg Hawkes recalled the first time he heard the song in an interview, saying, "I remember hearing 'Just What I Needed,' thinking ... 'Wow, that's pretty cool. It's got something sort of unique about it, its, like, nice and consise and ... fairly short pop song format' ... so I still remember hearing that for the first time."

The song first appeared in 1977 on Boston radio stations WCOZ and WBCN from the demo tape, along with its future follow-up single "My Best Friend's Girl". DJ Maxanne Sartori, who was given the tapes of these songs by Ocasek, recalled, "I began playing the demos of 'Just What I Needed' and 'My Best Friend's Girl' in March during my weekday slot, from 2 to 6 p.m. Calls poured in with positive comments." Shortly thereafter, it became one of the stations' most requested songs.

Composition
"Just What I Needed" is a new wave and power pop song, described as having a "hard rock punch". The song's opening riff was borrowed from "Yummy Yummy Yummy" by the Ohio Express. It also features a prominent keyboard riff performed by Greg Hawkes. The lyric "wasting all my time-time" is a reference to "Sister Ray" by the Velvet Underground, a band Ocasek credited as one of his favorites. The song was sung by the Cars' bassist Benjamin Orr, in a performance that Ultimate Classic Rock described as "perfect."

In 2003, pop rock band Fountains of Wayne would in turn copy the Cars' take on the riff for their song "Stacy's Mom". This prompted Ric Ocasek to say the opening was a sample; however, the band has insisted they "got it right".

Release
"Just What I Needed" was released as a single in 1978 prior to the release of The Cars, backed with "I'm in Touch with Your World". The song peaked at number 27 on the US Billboard Hot 100 and number 17 on the UK Singles Chart, as well as number 38 in New Zealand. The single was the Cars' most successful of the songs on The Cars in the United States, with follow-up singles "My Best Friend's Girl" and "Good Times Roll" charting at numbers 35 and 41, respectively.

"Just What I Needed" appeared on multiple compilation albums, among them being Greatest Hits, Just What I Needed: The Cars Anthology, Shake It Up & Other Hits, Complete Greatest Hits, The Essentials, and Classic Tracks. It appeared on the soundtracks for the films Boys Don’t Cry, Over the Edge and 200 Cigarettes. The song was also featured in an advertising campaign by Circuit City in 2004. "Just What I Needed" has since been covered by several artists, including by the Strokes with Jarvis Cocker in 2011, the Killers in 2018, and the Red Hot Chili Peppers in 2019.

Reception
AllMusic reviewer Donald A. Guarisco praised it as "a clever pop song", commenting that "Elliot Easton's fiery guitar leads duel with Greg Hawkes' icy synth lines over a throbbing pop/rock backbeat while Benjamin Orr lays down a fey, detached vocal that captures the sarcastic edge of the lyrics with skill." Billboard said that it was energized by a "driving, propulsive beat" and enhanced by "feisty rock guitar lines" and "a winning harmonic vocal style."  Cash Box said that "the ticking guitar opening is reminiscent of Tommy James & The Shondells and that "the tight-lick guitar work and excellent singing" make it likely to go to the top of pop music playlists.  Record World said that "Roy Thomas Baker's production and the group's lively vocals makes the record a standout." Rolling Stone named the song one of Ocasek's "essential songs", praising the "chugging eighth-note guitars marching along in crisp perfection" in the song.

Ultimate Classic Rock named the song the best Cars song as well as the best Benjamin Orr Cars song, saying "On a near-perfect debut album, the Roy Thomas Baker-produced "Just What I Needed" was a near-perfect song." The site also ranked it the 35th best classic rock song of all time.  The song was also ranked among the band and Ocasek's best by The New York Times, NME, Esquire, and Inquisitr.

In 2021, Rolling Stone added "Just What I Needed" to their list of "500 Greatest Songs of All Time," ranking it at 369 and writing that the song "defined [the band's] mix of precision-tuned sleekness and creepy mystery."

Personnel 

 Ric Ocasek – backing vocals, rhythm guitar
 Elliot Easton – lead guitar, backing vocals
 Benjamin Orr – lead vocals, bass guitar
 David Robinson – drums, percussion
 Greg Hawkes – keyboards, backing vocals

Charts

Weekly charts

Year-end charts

References

1978 debut singles
1978 songs
The Cars songs
Elektra Records singles
Song recordings produced by Roy Thomas Baker
Songs written by Ric Ocasek